Juxtaposition Arts is a youth oriented non-profit visual art center in North Minneapolis, Minnesota, and it is known for community collaborations, studio classes and workshops, public mural programs, and art exhibitions

Mission 
"Juxtaposition Arts develops community by engaging and employing young urban artists in hands-on education initiatives that create pathways to self-sufficiency while actualizing creative power."

Information
Juxtaposition Arts was founded in 1995 by DeAnna Cummings, her husband Roger Cummings, and Peyton Scott Russell. the organization's mission is to empower the youth and community to use the arts to actualize their full potential.  It originated as an after-school program teaching airbrushing and graffiti art. JXTA's youth artists work with local organizations such  to learn how to make money while embracing their passions.

Juxtaposition Arts provides visual arts literacy training and design based jobs for the youth in the community. This approach not only motivates the next generation of creative workers, but the production and output from these jobs that include murals, public art, graphic design, art installations, and clothing. They employ 70 artists ages 14 – 22 as art apprentices and teach free art classes for students ages 8 – 22.

It is in the middle of an $8.2 million, six-year expansion.

In 2019, Juxtaposition Arts partnered with City of Skate to build a "Skate-able Art Plaza" which included flexible open spaces, art installations, a skate plaza, and sustainable storm water management. This project received $50,000 in funding each from the Mississippi Watershead Management Organization, a Kickstarter, and Minnesota Super Bowl Host Committee Legacy Fund.

Bank of America funded both Juxtapostion Arts and Project for Pride in Living through a $400,000 grant in 2019.

Notable work 
The Guthrie Theater in Minneapolis commissioned JXTA to create a work for its building as part of the theater's anti-racism commitments. The sculpture "Luminous Current" was installed on the ninth floor of the theater and created by D’Angelo Raymond and Temesgen Besha. As artist apprentices, they worked under guidance from lead designers and architects Niko Kubota and Sam Ero-Phillips. The glowing 40-foot long aluminum sculpture's 200 pounds hangs from the ceiling and was intended to evoke the area where the theater is located between the Mississippi River and downtown Minneapolis.

Notable alumni 
Minneapolis city council member Jeremiah Ellison got his start at Juxtaposition painting murals.

References

External links

1995 establishments in Minnesota
Arts centers in Minnesota
Art galleries established in 1995